The culture of Tripura is distinct and a bit similar to other people of Northeast India. However like Assam, Manipur, Burma and Southeast Asia culture of Tripura is characterized in small portion where people live in plain and hill areas. Tripura is a state in North East India. In the 2001 census of India, Bengalis  represented almost 70% of the population and the Tripuri population comprised 30% of Tripura's population. The Tripuri population (indigenous population) comprises some clans and ethnic groups with diverse languages and cultures. The largest native group was the Tripuri who had a population of 543,848 in 2001 census, representing 16.99% of the state population and 54.7% of the scheduled tribe population. The other group of people in order of decreasing population were Chakma (6.5%), Halam (4.8%), Mog (3.1%), Munda, Kuki tribes and Garo Hajong. Bengali is the most spoken language, due to the dominance of Bengali people in the state. Kokborok (Tripuri/Tiprakok) is a common language among Tripuris and lingua franca in Tripura. Several other languages belonging to Indo-European and Sino-Tibetan families are spoken by the different tribe

Tripura has several diverse ethno-linguistic groups, which has given rise to a composite culture. The dominant cultures are Tripuris who are: Tripura, Debbarma, Jamatia, Reang, Noatia, Koloi, Murasing, Rupini Uchoi,
and tribes like Chakma, Halam, Garo, Hajong, Kuki, Mizo, Mogh, Munda, Oraon, Santhal

Tripuri Traditional Attire
Tripuris have their own traditional dress, similar in style to that of other North-East Indian peoples. It is, however, different in pattern and design. The clothing for the lower half of the body is called rignai in Tripuri and for the upper half of the body, the clothing has two parts, the risa and rikutu.

Isree(Qeen) Monmohini Devi in Traditional Risa
The risa covers the chest area and the rikutu covers the whole of the upper half of the body. Formerly, these garments were woven by women using home-spun cotton thread. Nowadays, the threads are bought from the market and the risa is not worn; instead a blouse is worn by most Tripuri women. Girls wear rignai with tops, too.
Each Tripuri clan has its own rignai pattern and design. The patterns of the rignai are so distinct that the clan of a Tripuri woman can be identified by the pattern of her rignai. However, there is intermingling of the rignai: Clans wear the rignai of other clans freely and new designs are being woven.
The rikutu is plain cloth of a different colour and shade than the other items of clothing. Today, the rikutu is woven by Tripuri women.

A young Tripuri woman wearing rigwnai and risa
Some fashion types that are woven in the rignai borok by Tripuri women are as follows:
Anji
Banarosi
Chamthwibar
Jirabi
Khamjang
Khumbar
Kuaiphang
Kuaichu
Kuaichu bokobom
Kuaichu ulta
Malibar
Miyong
Muikhunchok
Monaisora
Muisili
Natupalia
Phantokbar
Sada
Salu
Similik yapai
Takhumtei
Temanlia
Thaimaikrang
Thaiphlokbar
Tokbakbar
Tokha
Toksa
Toiling
Toprengsakhitung
Rignaichamwthwi
Rignai mereng
Metereng trang
Rignai khamchwi
Kwsakwpra
Rignaibru
Rignaikosong
Kwsapra
Songkai
Sorbangi
It is said that at the time of Subrai Raja, the most famous and legendary King of Tripura, through his 250 wives he had invented 250 designs of rignai. He married those women who invented a new design. But all these designs have been lost over time and only a few remain. An effort to rediscover the lost designs is in process.
The male counterpart for the loin area is rikutu and for the upper part of the body is the kamchwlwi borok. Today, however, very few men wear this style of dress except in rural Tripura and by the working class. Males have adopted more modern dres

Handicrafts
Tripura is noted for bamboo and cane handicrafts. Bamboo played important part in the jhumia (shifting cultivation) of the tribes. It was used to make watch stations on stilts and was devised to carry food and water. Besides these usages, bamboo, woods and cane were used to create an array of furniture, utensils, hand-held fans, replicas, mats, baskets, idols and interior decoration materials.

Songs and dances

Music and dances are integral part of the tribal people of Tripura. Some of their indigenous musical instruments are the sarinda, chongpreng, and sumui (a kind of flute). Songs are sung during religious occasions, weddings, and other festivals. Each tribal community has their own repertoire of songs and dances. The Tripuri and Jamatia tribe perform goria dance during the Goria puja. Jhum dance (also called tangbiti dance) in the harvest season, lebang dance, mamita dance, and mosak sulmani dance are other Tripuri dances. Reang community, the second largest tribe of the state, are noted for their hojagiri dance performed by young girls balancing on earthen pitchers.  The Bizhu dance is performed by the Chakmas during the Bizhu festival (the last day of the month of Chaitra). Other tribal dances are wangala dance of the Garo people, hai-hak dance of the Halam branch of Kuki people, sangrai dance and owa dance of the Mog tribe, and others. Besides tribal music, Indian classical music is also practiced among the residents. Sachin Dev Burman of the royal family was a maestro in the filmi genre of Indian music, creating many popular tunes in the bollywood films.

Festivals and worships
Hindus believe that Tripureshwari is the patron goddess of Tripura and an aspect of Shakti. Several fertility gods are also worshiped by the tribes, such as Lam-Pra (the twin deities of sky and sea), Mailu-ma (goddess of corn, identified with Lakshmi), Khulu-ma (goddess of the cotton plant), and Burha-sa (god of healing). Durga Puja, Kali Puja, Ashokastami and the worship of the Chaturdasha deities are important festivals. Several festivals represent confluence of several tribal traditions, such as Ganga puja, Garia puja, Kherchi puja, Ker puja.

Sculpture and architecture

Unakoti, Pilak, and Devtamura are historic sites where large collections of stone carvings and rock sculptures are noted. These sculptures are evidence of the presence of Buddhism and Brahmanical orders for centuries. These sculptures represent a rare artistic fusion of traditional religions and tribal influence.

Sports
Football and cricket are the most popular sports in the state. The state capital Agartala has its own club football championships every year where many local clubs compete in a league and knockout format. Tripura participates as an eastern state team in the Ranji Trophy, the Indian domestic cricket competition. The state also is a regular participant of the Indian National Games and the North Eastern Games. Tripura produced a few nationally successful players in gymnastics and swimming, but overall contribution in athletics, cricket, football and indoor games remained poor.

References

 
Tripuri culture